Winslow West is a census-designated place (CDP) in Coconino and Navajo counties in Arizona, United States. The population was 438 at the 2010 census. The entire community is off-reservation trust land belonging to the Hopi tribe.

Geography
Winslow West is located at  (35.037411, -110.748884).

Demographics

As of the census of 2000, there were 131 people, 30 households, and 30 families living in the CDP. The racial makeup of the CDP was 98.5% Native American. 1.5% of the population were Hispanic or Latino of any race.

There were 30 households, out of which 86.7% had children under the age of 18 living with them, 26.7% were married couples living together, 63.3% had a female householder with no husband present, and 0.0% were non-families. No households were made up of individuals, and none had someone living alone who was 65 years of age or older. The average household size was 4.37 and the average family size was 3.93.

In the CDP, the age distribution of the population shows 56.5% under the age of 18, 6.9% from 18 to 24, 31.3% from 25 to 44, 4.6% from 45 to 64, and 0.8% who were 65 years of age or older. The median age was 16 years. For every 100 females, there were 95.5 males. For every 100 females age 18 and over, there were 78.1 males.

The median income for a household in the CDP was $8,250, and the median income for a family was $8,250. Males had a median income of $0 versus $26,250 for females. The per capita income for the CDP was $3,951. There were 88.9% of families and 68.4% of the population living below the poverty line, including 56.2% of those under 18 and none of those over 64.

Education
It is in the Winslow Unified School District, which operates Winslow High School.

See also

 List of census-designated places in Arizona

References

 Winslow West CDP, Hopi Reservation Trust Land, Arizona, United States Census Bureau

External links

Census-designated places in Arizona
Census-designated places in Navajo County, Arizona
Census-designated places in Coconino County, Arizona
Hopi
Hopi Reservation